Hungary  competed at the inaugural World Beach Games in Doha, Qatar from 12 to 16 October 2019. In total athletes representing Hungary won three silver medals and one bronze medal. The country finished in 18th place in the medal table.

Medal summary

Medalists

References 

Nations at the 2019 World Beach Games
World Beach Games